Oliver Marić (born 11 March 1981) is a Croatian–Swiss former football player and current assistant manager of FC Stade Nyonnais.

He was previously a member of FC Wohlen, FC Schaffhausen, FC Lucerne and Servette FC. While growing up in Lucerne, Marić's family comes from Primošten on the Croatian coast.

References

External links
http://www.football.ch/sfl/821122/de/Kader.aspx?tId=0&pId=335977

1981 births
Living people
Sportspeople from Zadar
Croatian emigrants to Switzerland
Swiss men's footballers
FC Luzern players
FC Schaffhausen players
SC Kriens players
FC Concordia Basel players
Swiss Super League players
Place of birth missing (living people)
Swiss people of Croatian descent
Association football fullbacks